Dongri ka Raja is a 2016 Indian Hindi-language action-drama directed by Hadi Ali Abrar and produced by PS Chhatwal and Filmy Keeda Productions. It is set against the backdrop of the Dongri underworld and follows the love story of an underworld "raja" (king) of Dongri. It released on 11 November 2016.

Plot 

Raja (Gashmeer Mahajani) is the adopted son and sharpshooter of Dongri's most famous don Mansoor Ali (Ronit Roy). Mansoor wants Raja to success in his place after his death, so he trained him faithfully and treated him as his blood son.
Raja never failed any mission given by Mansoor. When killing people, Raja always wears a police uniform with the name of Siddhanth (Ashmit Patel), to pretend to be a police officer conducting operations, which makes Siddhanth blamed for many times. During one of his operations, Raja meets Shruti and falls for her. However, Raja feels hopeless about his love for Shruti because of his profession, so he lies to her by saying he's a house agent. Unaware of Raja's real identity and profession, Shruti gradually falls for him too.

Inspector Siddhant, who's in charge of Mansoor's case, disappoints his senior for his failure to close the case in the promised time. Damie (Kamlesh Sawant), another of his seniors blames him too for not only he failed to collect evidence against Mansoor, but Mansoor's men started killing people, which never happened before he took over the case. Their senior then decides to transfer this case to Damie. Damie, in fact, is a corrupted officer who's bribed by and works for Mansoor, after he takes over the case, he solved the murder committed by Mansoor's men easily. He arrests an innocent man and threatens to kill him to make him claim responsibility for those murders, and state he has no relation with Mansoor, in front of a video camera. After the innocent man "pleads guilty" in the video, Damie kills him as is hence praised by his senior, news media, and Mansoor too.

Shruti invites Raja to a religious ceremony held in the area ruled by Daya (Sacheen Suvarna), Raja and Mansoor's enemy. Raja's fellows try to discourage him from risking his life to attend the ceremony, but Raja insists to meeting Shruti. During the ceremony, Raja is seen and attacked by Daya but he manages to survive and is admitted to a hospital. In the hospital, Siddhanth shows up and tries to reveal Raja's real identity to Shruti, whose love Raja won by cheating. However, Raja denies Siddhanth's accusation and Shruti chooses to believe her lover.

After Raja returns home, he and Shruti confess their love to each other, but his love distracts him largely from his jobs, making him hide it from Mansoor. Mansoor always wants Raja to fulfill his dream, which is to be another don like him, as Raja's mother (Ashwini Kalsekar) thinks father's dream is less important than son's love and happiness. She then encourages Raja to talk to Shruti's parents about their marriage. Raja agrees with her.

Shruti's father doesn't agree with Raja and Shruti's marriage because he feels Raja is lying about his profession. Raja then decides to elope with Shruti and marry without telling her parents, During their wedding, Inspector Siddhanth arrives with a group of armed officers to arrest Raja, telling him that the bride is in fact his younger sister, who pretended to be in love with him to get close to him and collect evidence of his crimes. Shruti's mission is completed and Raja is arrested while all his fellows are killed during their attempt to escape.

Raja's mother then approaches to Shruti and tells her that Raja's love has changed him a lot. He was a don and a criminal who killed without hesitation, but now he's not in the mood of being a don any more. Even after he knows he was cheated by her, he still loves her a lot. Shruti is moved and suddenly realizes that her pretended love for Raja has already been true. She then rejects to testify against Raja in the court, making Raja released.

In his house, Mansoor is angry about his son being cheated and orders him to kill Shruti and Raja agrees. Shruti risks her life to rush to Raja's house and takes him out to apologize and confess her true love to him. At this very moment, Siddhanth and his men show up to shoot Raja, making Raja feel being cheated again. Raja shoots Shruti and manages to escape.

Rajs is later told that Shruti survived the gunshot and is admitted to a hospital, he then decides to go to the hospital to kill her again. in the hospital, Shruti confesses her love to Raja again, making Raja unable to shoot her and is later arrested again by Siddhanth.

Damie frees Raja with his greater power than Siddhanth's. Siddhanth then kills Damie in the public and calling the crowd who's already angry with Mansoor and Damie's crime to testify against Raja for Damie's murder. Siddhanth arrests Shruti with a Cover-up charge, and Raja loses his mind after he realizes their love for each other is both true and solid.

Raja breaks his relation with Mansoor, who never supports his love but always wants him to be a don; he then forcefully saves Shruti from the police and escapes with her. On their way of escaping from the city, they get married. But their happy days last for no longer than 2 days before they are caught again at one of the checkpoints that Siddhanth set to catch them. In the impasse, Raja takes Shruti as a hostage with an empty gun (an act that was told to Shruti) to demande Siddhanth give him free passage.

Siddhanth shoots Raja and kills him. The film ends.

Cast 
 Ronit Roy as Mansoor Ali , a underworld don
 Gashmeer Mahajani as Raja (based on Dawood Ibrahim)
 Ashmit Patel as Inspector Siddhanth
 Reecha Sinha as Shruti
 Ashwini Kalsekar as Raja's mother
 Sacheen Suvarna as Daya
 Kamlesh Sawant as Sadashiv Damie, corrupt inspector
 Kumar Saurabh as Goonga
 Mukesh Tiwari as Qawwali singer
 Sunny Leone in the item number "Choli Block Buster"

Production

Soundtrack

Track listing

Release

Critical reception

References

External links

2010s Hindi-language films
Indian action drama films
Films shot in Mumbai
Indian police films
Indian gangster films
Fictional portrayals of the Maharashtra Police
Indian films based on actual events
Films scored by Asad Khan
2016 action drama films
D-Company